

Ronald B. Inden is a professor emeritus in the Departments of History and of South Asian Languages and Civilizations at the University of Chicago and is a major scholar in South Asian and post-colonial studies. Inden has been a lifelong resident of Hyde Park, the Chicago community which contains the University.

Education
He was educated at the Lab School, and then the University of Chicago.

Career

Inden has spent the bulk of his professional career at University of Chicago.
Inspired by Edward Said's Orientalism, he began a critical investigation  of how social scientific knowledge was shaped by the colonial conditions of its production. Imagining India was a critical survey of the field of Indology and argued that most scholarship consistently failed to treat Indians as rational subjects and knowing actors who were intelligently involved in the creation of their social worlds. "The immense learning and analytical sharpness of the book is evident from the very first chapter" Post-Orientalist Strategies explored ways of knowing India that are not so limited by colonialism and its legacies.

R. G. Collingwood's works, including An Essay on Philosophical Method and The Idea of History, were especially influential in Inden's thought during this period. He took Collingwood's notion of a "scale of forms" and used it to develop an approach opposed to a "hierarchy of essences". In general, in Inden's work the past two decades, the focus has been on the limitations of what he calls essentializing or substantializing discourses which understand agents as more or less reflections of a single, internally consistent idea. He argues that Indology returns to a small number of relatively fixed themes to make sense out of India. India, in this Indological version, is feminine, jungle-like, religious, caste-riven, village-based, irrational and, fundamentally, the opposite of the West. Inden, on the contrary, emphasizes that there's an irreducible tension in scholarship and that India and the West need to be understood as both "opposites" and "distincts" and that they have "differences in quality" as well as "differences in kind". Essentializing forms of knowledge emphasize only the differences in quality and the extent to which the West and India are opposites.

Inden's more recent research takes up the ways that national and ethnic identities in 20th century India were articulated with references to changes in local and global ruling class relations.

References

Publications
Post-Orientalist Strategies
Imagining India. Oxford, Basil Blackwell, 1990;
Marriage and Rank in Bengali Culture: A History of Caste and Clan in Middle Period Bengal. University of California Press, 1975.
"Transcending Identities in Modern India's World," in Politics and the Ends of Identity, ed. Kathryn Dean. London, Ashgate, 1997, 64-102.
"Embodying God: From Imperial Progresses to National Progress in India," Economy and Society, 24.2 (May 1995), 245–78.
"Changes in the Vedic Priesthood," Ritual, State and History in South Asia: Essays in honour of J. C. Heesterman, ed. A. W. van den Hoek, D. H. A. Kolff, & M. S. Oort. Leiden, E. J. Brill, 1992, pp. 556–77.
"Tradition Against Itself," American Ethnologist, XIII.4 (November 1986), 762–75.
"Orientalist Constructions of India," Modern Asian Studies, XX.3 (1986), 401–46.

===Reviews of Imagining India'''===
Mani, Lata. The Journal of Asian Studies Vol. 50, No. 2 (May, 1991), pp. 435–436
Mines, Mattison. American Ethnologist Vol. 20, No. 2 (May, 1993), pp. 415–416
Prakash, Gyan. The American Historical Review Vol. 97, No. 2 (Apr., 1992), pp. 601–602
Raheja, Gloria Goodwin. American Anthropologist New Series, Vol. 94, No. 1 (Mar., 1992), pp. 235–236
Quigley, Declan. Modern Asian Studies'', Vol. 25, No. 2 (1991), pp. 403–406.

External links
Inden's homepage at the University of Chicago

Living people
Year of birth missing (living people)
University of Chicago alumni
University of Chicago faculty
American Indologists
American orientalists
Indology